Subtitle Edit (also known as SE) is a free and open-source subtitle editor to create, edit, adjust or synchronize subtitles for videos.

Features

SE supports 250+ subtitle formats. Some of the most popular ones are SubRip, Timed Text, DFXP (Netflix standards), ITT (iTunes), SubStation Alpha, MicroDVD, SAMI, D-Cinema and BdSub. It uses the VLC media player, MPC-HC,  Mpv or DirectShow to play videos.

It is available in 34 languages and works on Windows and Linux.

Development 
In 2001, Nikolaj Lynge Olsson had started the development of Subtitle Edit in Delphi which continued until April 2009. On 6 March 2009, 2.0 Beta 1 version (build 42401) was released.

Over time, more developers have contributed to SE's development, and it is still active. It is hosted at GitHub.

On May 17, 2011, the developer unannounced the testing version of SE 3.2 for Linux. It uses the same source code that was developed for Windows, to implement it on Linux using Mono Project.

On October 17, 2011, the developer unannounced the availability of stable version for Linux. The developer himself stated that it is working well on Ubuntu.

See also 
Comparison of subtitle editors

References

Further reading

External links 
 
Github repository

Subtitling
Video editing software
Free software
Free software programmed in C Sharp
Cross-platform free software
Free application software
Free multilingual software
Pascal (programming language) software